Hazyville is the debut album by the electronic musician Actress. It was initially released on November 28, 2008, by Werk Discs, and later under Ninja Tune.

Track listing

References 

2008 debut albums
Actress (musician) albums
Werk Discs albums
Ninja Tune albums